The 2011 Kentucky Derby was the 137th running of the Kentucky Derby, on May 7. The race was won by Animal Kingdom, ridden by John Velazquez, trained by H. Graham Motion and owned by Team Valor.

The race took place on Saturday, May 7, 2011, and was televised in the United States on the NBC television network.

A record crowd of 164,858 was on hand at the track for the race.

Contenders
The leading contenders for the race were Dialed In (Holy Bull, Florida Derby), Uncle Mo (Breeders' Cup Juvenile), Nehro (second in the Arkansas Derby), Midnight Interlude (Santa Anita Derby) and Mucho Macho Man (Risen Star Stakes). Pants of Fire, winner of the Louisiana Derby and ridden by Rosie Napravnik, was bet down from odds of 20-1 on the morning line to 8-1 at post time. Animal Kingdom, coming into the race off of a win in the Spiral Stakes over Turfway Park's synthetic dirt course, was largely dismissed at 21-1.

Details
Shackleford (14) went to the early lead, setting moderate fractions of :23.24 seconds for the opening quarter-mile and :48.63 for the half. He was tracked by Comma to the Top, who tired after the first three-quarters of a mile were completed in 1:13.40, eventually finishing last. Nehro, who had rated a few lengths off the pace, made his move on the far turn and moved into the lead at the top of the stretch. Meanwhile, Animal Kingdom (16) had settled near the back of the back and was in tenth position going into the final turn. Moving four wide, he advanced into fifth place at the mile pole and closed steadily to win by  lengths. Nehro (19) finished a neck in front of a late-closing Mucho Macho Man (13), with Shackleford hanging on for fourth.

The winning jockey, John R. Velazquez, had recently switched to riding Animal Kingdom, after his prior horse, Uncle Mo (former 2nd choice, 9-2), had been scratched earlier within the week.

Results

Margins –  lengths, neck
Time – 2:02:04
Track – Fast

Payout

The 137th Kentucky Derby Payout Schedule

 $2 Exacta: (16–19)  paid  $329.80
 $2 Trifecta: (16–19-13)  paid  $3,952.40
 $2 Superfecta: (16–19-13-14)  paid  $48,126.00

Notable achievements

 Animal Kingdom became the first Kentucky Derby winner to have never previously raced on a dirt track.
 Animal Kingdom became the first horse since Exterminator in 1918 to win the Derby with only four previous starts.
 Animal Kingdom became the first horse since Needles in 1956 to win the race off a six-week layoff.

Subsequent Grade I wins
Several horses from the Derby went on to win at the Grade I level.
 Animal Kingdom – 2013 Dubai World Cup
 Mucho Macho Man – 2013 Awesome Again, Breeders' Cup Classic 
 Shackleford – Preakness Stakes, 2012 Metropolitan Handicap, Clark Handicap
 Master of Hounds – 2013 Jebel Hatta (UAE)
 Stay Thirsty – Travers Stakes, 2012 Cigar Mile Handicap

Subsequent breeding careers
Leading progeny of participants in the 2011 Kentucky Derby are as follows.

Mucho Macho Man
 Mucho Gusto – Pegasus World Cup

Shackleford - exported to South Korea in 2020
 Promises Fulfilled – H. Allen Jerkens Stakes

Stay Thirsty
 Mind Control – Hopeful Stakes, H. Allen Jerkens Stakes

Dialed In
 Gunnevera – Fountain of Youth Stakes. second in Breeders Cup Classic and Travers Stakes

Sources: American Classic Pedigrees, Equibase, Blood-Horse Stallion Register

See also
 2011 Preakness Stakes
 2011 Belmont Stakes
 2011 Breeders' Cup

References

External links

 2011 Kentucky Derby
 Photo of winning horse, Animal Kingdom - from Bleacherreport.net
 Photo in Winner's Circle, with the roses - from TimesUnion.com

Kentucky Derby races
Kentucky Derby
Derby
May 2011 sports events in the United States